Eva Norvind (born Eva Johanne Chegodayeva Sakonsky; May 7, 1944 – May 14, 2006) was a Norwegian-born Mexican actress, writer, documentary producer, director, sex therapist, and dominatrix.

Early life
Norvind was the daughter of Russian prince Paul Vernstad née Chegodayef Sakonsky and Finnish sculptor Johanna Kajanus, who won the bronze medal for sculpture at the Exposition Internationale des Arts et Techniques dans la Vie Moderne (1937). Norvind, her mother and her brother moved to France when Norvind was 15 years old.

Career
The following year she won the second prize in the beauty contest at the Cannes Film Festival which enabled her to win a minor role in the film Saint Tropez Blues. She then joined the cast of the Folies Bergère and changed her stage name to Eva Norvind. She also appeared in A School for Scandal at the Comédie-Française.

In 1962, Norvind moved to Canada and then to New York City, where at the age of 18 she worked as a Playboy Bunny and a Can-Can dancer. She finished high school in 1964 and then moved to Mexico City to study Spanish when she was recruited as an actress. She made seven films in Mexico, her last one being Báñame mi amor in 1968.

Norvind was the object of controversy in Mexico, when on the highly censored national television she spoke in defense of birth control. The government of Mexico then asked her to leave the country within 24 hours but with the help of the National Association of Actors she was able to stay in the country, although she was forbidden from appearing on television for one year. She performed in two plays, En el closet, no and Machiavelli's La mandragola (The Mandrake).

In 1968, she became a photographer covering fashion and celebrity news - traveling to Paris and New York City. She also wrote film articles and worked on distribution of Mexican films to Scandinavia and vice versa.

In 1970, Norvind gave birth to her daughter Nailea Norvind in Mexico City and returned to New York City in 1980 to study film at New York University (NYU), graduating in 1982 with a Bachelor in Fine Arts degree. In 1985, she became interested in erotic power exchange and two years later founded Taurel Associates, an umbrella company for counselling, erotic role play and video production for health related services. She gave lectures at national conferences worldwide, to both health professionals and lay audiences. In 1996, she obtained her master's degree in Human Sexuality from NYU. The following year, a movie about her life entitled Didn't Do It For Love was  made by German filmmaker Monika Treut. She appeared in that film as well as in the 1999 film Tops & Bottoms.

In 1999, John McTiernan hired Norvind to coach Rene Russo for her assertive sexual image in The Thomas Crown Affair for which she got screen credit.  Norvind also pursued graduate studies in Forensic Psychology at John Jay College of Criminal Justice. In 2003, she provided sexual consultation for the film Distress.

Death
Norvind died on 14 May 2006, drowned in the waters off the beaches of Zipolite, in Oaxaca, Mexico. At the time of her death, she was writing, directing and producing a documentary about severely disabled Mexican actor and musician José Flores, entitled Born Without. In March 2007, Born Without won Best International Documentary at the Festival Internacional de Cine Contemporaneo de la Ciudad De Mexico (FICCO), Best Documentary Feature at the Vancouver International Film Festival 2008 and the Audience Award for Best International Feature at the 2009 LA Film Festival.

Plays
 La Mandragola (The Mandrake)
 En el Closet, no

Films
 Saint Tropez Blues (1961) as a German Tourist
 Pacto de sangre (1966) as Helen
 Esta noche no (1966) as Blond in Acapulco
 Juan Pistolas (1966)
 Nuestros buenos vecinos de Yucatán (1967)
 Santo el Enmascarado de Plata vs. la invasión de los marcianos (1967) as Selene
 Don Juan 67 (1967) as Helga
 Un yucateco honoris causa (1967)
 Báñame mi amor (1968) as Priestess
 Whipped (1998) as herself
 The City (2007) as herself

References

External links
 Los Angeles Film Festival website
 Review of 'Born Without' in Variety

The outrageous life of Eva Norvind
Festival Internacional de Cine Contemporaneo de la Ciudad De Mexico
Eva's bio from the 2007 film, The City

1944 births
2006 deaths
Deaths by drowning
Accidental deaths in Mexico
Mexican film actresses
Mexican stage actresses
Mexican women writers
20th-century Mexican actresses
21st-century Mexican actresses
Norwegian emigrants to France
Norwegian emigrants to Canada
Norwegian emigrants to the United States
Norwegian emigrants to Mexico
Norwegian people of Russian descent
Norwegian people of Finnish descent
Mexican dominatrices
Mexican women journalists
People from Trondheim
Norvind family